Lake Võrtsjärv is a lake in southern Estonia with an area of 270 km² (104 mi²).

It is the second largest lake in Estonia (behind Lake Peipus), and the largest lake situated entirely within Estonia. The shallow lake is 33.7 m (111 ft) above sea level. The river Emajõgi flows from Lake Võrtsjärv to Lake Peipus.

History
The lake basin existed before the Last Ice Age, but was then transformed by moving ice sheets which partly eroded the lake wall and partly filled the depression with deposits. In its present form the lake has existed since the Middle Holocene.

It was first mentioned in the Livonian Chronicle of Henry, where it is called Worcegerwe.

Geography
The relatively low shores of the lake are swampy in the south and sandy in the north. On the eastern shore, there is a coastal abrasion near the village of Tamme; these cliffs have yielded a number of fossils of Devonian fish, which have been compared to similar fossils found in Scotland.

There are a few small islands in the southern part of the lake. Of these only Tondisaar and Pähksaar are permanent islands, while Ainsaar becomes a peninsula during low water and Heinassaar is submerged at high water. This is because of the lakes fluctuating water level, which changes with a mean annual amplitude of 1.4 m; this is about half of its 2.8 m average depth. From around November to April, the lake is covered with an ice sheet.

Situated northeast of the lake is the Alam-Pedja Nature Reserve, the largest nature reserve in Estonia.

Ecology
Around 35 species of fish are found in the lake, a few of which are commercially important. After a decline of valuable species during the 1950s and 1960s, some conservation measures were enforced which lead to an improvement in the situation. Today, around 400 t of fish are caught annually.

Lake Võrtsjärv is the main catchment area for eel in Estonia. However, fishing is entirely dependent on restocking with farmed glass eels, as eels are migratory and do no longer return in sufficient quantities to Europe. Due to declining numbers of natural eel, in 2017 the European Union's Agriculture and Fisheries Council decided on a three-month ban of eel fishing in the Baltic Sea during eel migratory season. Eel caught in the Baltic Sea had only accounted for a mere 700 kg the year before, as opposed to an average of 10.2-13.3 t per year in Lake Võrtsjärv.

The lake and the nearby wetlands are also an important breeding ground for birds, as well as a staging area for migratory birds. In total, 213 bird species have been recorded around the lake.

In recent decades, eutrophication of the lake has increased, with detrimental effects on biological diversity. This is thought to be mainly caused by a combination of poorly treated wastewater influx as well as phosphorus and nitrate runoff from agriculture. In addition, climatic fluctuations seem to have a stronger influence on the lake due to its shallow depth.

Tourism
The region is little known as a tourist destination internationally, and the deteriorating water quality has posed a problem for both fishing and tourism development. However, Võrtsjärv was voted European Destination of Excellence in 2010.

There is a visitor centre and museum on the east shore of the lake.

In 2016, the lake was the site of the WISSA World Championships in iceboating on the frozen lake.

References

External links

More information about eel fishing in the lake
Tourism brochure from 2010 in Estonian and English, including information about Lake Võrtsjärv
History of hydrological and biological investigations of lake Võrtsjärv

Lakes of Estonia
Lakes of Tartu County
Lakes of Viljandi County
Lakes of Valga County
LVortsjarv